In mathematics, the indicator vector or characteristic vector or incidence vector of a subset T of a set S is the vector  such that  if  and  if 

If S is countable and its elements are numbered so that , then  where  if  and  if 

To put it more simply, the indicator vector of T is a vector with one element for each element in S, with that element being one if the corresponding element of S is in T, and zero if it is not.

An indicator vector is a special (countable) case of an indicator function.

Example
If S is the set of natural numbers , and T is some subset of the natural numbers, then the indicator vector is naturally a single point in the Cantor space: that is, an infinite sequence of 1's and 0's, indicating membership, or lack thereof, in T.  Such vectors commonly occur in the study of arithmetical hierarchy.

Notes

Basic concepts in set theory
Vectors (mathematics and physics)